Svitlana Mamyeyeva, Ukr. Світлана Мамєєва (born 19 April 1982) is a Ukrainian triple jumper.

She competed at the 2008 Olympic Games without reaching the final.

Her personal best jump is 14.26 metres, achieved in July 2008 in Kyiv.

References

1982 births
Living people
Ukrainian female triple jumpers
Athletes (track and field) at the 2008 Summer Olympics
Olympic athletes of Ukraine
Place of birth missing (living people)
21st-century Ukrainian women